Kalyn Schwartz (born May 10, 1989) is an American mixed martial artist. She competes in the strawweight division of the Invicta Fighting Championships.

Background 
Schwartz started training mixed martial arts (MMA) when serving as a United States Marine Corps at the Marine Corps Martial Arts Program, and started competing in amateur MMA in Oregon.

Mixed martial arts career

Amateur career 
Schwartz started her amateur career in 2014, and fought professionally four years later in 2016. She had four amateur fights under Rogue Fights, Rumble and King of the Cage (KOTC) promotions. She was the amateur bantamweight champion for Rogue Fights and Rumble at the Roseland in 2014 and she also the strawweight amateur champion for KOTC. She amassed a record of 6-0 prior signed by Invicta Fighting Championships (Invicta) in August 2016.

Invicta Fighting Championships 

Schwartz made her promotional debut on March 23, 2016, at Invicta FC 19: Maia vs. Modafferi against two times formal world kickboxing champion Tiffany van Soest. She won the fight via a rear-naked choke.  This win earned her the Invicta fan choice award (submission of the year). This win earned her the Invicta fan choice award (submission of the year)

Schwartz faced Miranda Maverick on March 25, 2017, at Invicta FC 22: Evinger vs. Kunitskaya 2 against  Miranda Maverick. She lost the fight on round one.

Her next fight came on March 24, 2018, at Invicta FC 28: Mizuki vs. Jandiroba against Kay Hansen, and she won the fight via technical knock-out.

Championships and accomplishments

Mixed martial arts 

 Invicta Fighting Championships 
 Invicta Fighting Championships Fan Choice Awards (submission of the year) vs. Tifany van Soest

Personal life 
Schwartz attends Southern Oregon University (SOU), majoring in Fitness Technician, and she represents the women's 123 Ibs wrestling division for SOU.

Schwartz was a United States Marine Corps veteran, specializing in aircraft rescue and firefighting. "The biggest resemblance is the mental toughness and discipline," said Schwartz. "The Marines taught me discipline and intensity. I use that in wrestling every day.

Mixed martial arts record

Professional Record 

|-
| Win
| align=center| 2–1
| Kay Hansen
| TKO (referee stoppage)
| Invicta FC 28: Mizuki vs. Jandiroba
| 
| align=center| 2
| align=center| 4:27
| Chicago, Illinois, United States
|
|-
| Loss
| align=center| 1–1
| Miranda Maverick
| Submission (armbar)
| Invicta FC 22: Evinger vs. Kunitskaya 2
| 
| align=center| 1
| align=center| 3:01
| Nashville, Tennessee, United States
|
|-
| Win
| align=center| 1–0
| Tiffany van Soest
| Submission (rear-naked choke)
| Invicta FC 19: Maia vs. Modafferi
| 
| align=center| 2
| align=center| 2:08
| Charlotte, North Carolina, United States
|
|-

Amateur Record 

|-
| Win
| align=center| 4–0
| Brittany Simms 
| Decision (unanimous)
| KOTC: Rogue Wave 
| 
| align=center| 3
| align=center| 5:00
| Lincoln City, Oregon, United States
|
|-
| Win
| align=center| 3–0
| Rebecca Wells 
| Decision (unanimous)
| KOTC: World Amateur Championships 2 
| 
| align=center| 3
| align=center| 5:00
| Ontario, California, United States
|
|-
| Win
| align=center| 2–0
| Lisa Spangler 
| Decision (unanimous)
| Rumble at the Roseland 79 
| 
| align=center| 3
| align=center| 5:00
| Portland, Oregon, United States
|
|-
| Win
| align=center| 1–0
| Maria Corona 
| Decision (unanimous)
| Rogue Fights 27 
| 
| align=center| 3
| align=center| 5:00
| Medford, Oregon, United States
|
|-

See also 
 List of current Invicta FC fighters
 List of female mixed martial artists

References

External links 
 
 Kalyn Schwartz at Invicta FC (archived)

Living people
1989 births
American female mixed martial artists
Strawweight mixed martial artists
Mixed martial artists utilizing MCMAP
Mixed martial artists utilizing wrestling
Mixed martial artists utilizing Brazilian jiu-jitsu
American practitioners of Brazilian jiu-jitsu
Female Brazilian jiu-jitsu practitioners
Sportspeople from Medford, Oregon
United States Marines
21st-century American women
Mixed martial artists from Oregon
Mixed martial artists from California
People from Santee, California